The 2007 Ukrainian Amateur Cup  was the twelfth annual season of Ukraine's football knockout competition for amateur football teams. The competition started on 8 August 2007 and concluded on 21 October 2007.

Competition schedule
This year Nikopol, Laris Kalynivka, KONFERMAT Khmelnytskyi, and Torpedo Mykolaiv started their participation from the 1/16 finals. The games has never taken place as well as one of the games between Nizhyn and FC Yednist-2 Plysky.

First round (1/16)

Second round (1/8)

Quarterfinals (1/4)

Semifinals (1/2)

Final

See also
 2007 Ukrainian Football Amateur League
 2007–08 Ukrainian Cup

External links
 2007 Ukrainian Amateur Cup  at the Footpass (Football Federation of Ukraine)

2007
Amateur Cup
Amateur Cup
Ukrainian Amateur Cup, 2007